The  is an  or  (painted narrative handscroll) from the Kamakura period of Japanese history (1185–1333). The work is classified as Important Cultural Property and is preserved at the Tokyo National Museum, but four fragments became detached during the 19th century.

Background
 
 
Originating in Japan in the sixth or seventh century through trade with the Chinese Empire, the art of the  spread widely among the aristocracy in the Heian period. An  consists of one or more long scrolls of paper narrating a story through  texts and paintings. The narrative assumes a series of scenes, the rhythm, composition and transitions of which are entirely the artist's sensitivity and technique. The themes of the stories were very varied: illustrations of novels, historical chronicles, religious texts, biographies of famous people, humorous or fantastic anecdotes, etc.

Illustrations of novels, stories or newspapers were appreciated by the ladies of the court during the Heian period.

Description
 
 
She falls in love with a minor captain and becomes engaged to him. Her stepmother, however, compels the minor captain to marry her own daughter instead. She also prevents the girl from serving at the palace or marrying a watchman. When the girl discovers the truth, she escapes to the Sumiyoshi Grand Shrine. He and the girl get married and live happily ever after, while the stepmother ends her life in poverty and disgrace. The novel dates from the 10th century in the Heian period, but the original is known only by a 12th century copy.

Style and composition
The  was created in the  painting style.

That depiction aims to reflect the evolution of time, so that some characters appear several times in the same scene to illustrate successive phases of the story.

Provenance
The oldest preserved  illustrating the  dates from the end of 13th century or the beginning of the 14th  century, although earlier illustrations have existed in the past. That  is nowadays in the form of a  paper scroll composed of a single long painting, without text.

The Tokyo National Museum has the horizontal scroll and one of the fragments. Another fragment is held by the Metropolitan Museum of Art in New York (since 2015); the rest belong to individuals. There is also a single fragment of the original text, but with only three lines.

Other versions
The Kyoto National Museum has a three scroll version of the Edo period.

See also
List of National Treasures of Japan (paintings)
National Treasure (Japan)

References

Notes

Bibliography

External links

 The Tale of Sumiyoshi (Sumiyoshi monogatari) – image and description of the fragment held by the Metropolitan Museum of Art, New York

Emakimono
Important Cultural Properties of Japan
Paintings in the collection of the Metropolitan Museum of Art
Paintings in the collection of the Tokyo National Museum